Please Don't Go is the debut single from singer Nayobe. The single was released in late 1984 and was included in the first Nayobe's album. The song became the first Nayobe success, reaching No. 23 on the Billboard Hot Dance Music/Club Play chart. In 1985, a Spanish version of the song was released with the title "No Te Vayas".

Track listings

12" single

12" single (Spanish version)

Charts

References

1984 singles
Nayobe songs
1984 songs